In mathematics, Kaplansky's theorem on quadratic forms is a result on simultaneous representation of primes by quadratic forms. It was proved in 2003 by Irving Kaplansky.

Statement of the theorem
Kaplansky's theorem states that a prime p congruent to 1 modulo 16 is representable by both or none of x2 + 32y2 and x2 + 64y2, whereas a prime p congruent to 9 modulo 16 is representable by exactly one of these quadratic forms.

This is remarkable since the primes represented by each of these forms individually are not describable by congruence conditions.

Proof
Kaplansky's proof uses the facts that 2 is a 4th power modulo p if and only if p is representable by x2 + 64y2, and that −4 is an 8th power modulo p if and only if p is representable by x2 + 32y2.

Examples
The prime p = 17 is congruent to 1 modulo 16 and is representable by neither x2 + 32y2 nor x2 + 64y2.
The prime p = 113 is congruent to 1 modulo 16 and is representable by both x2 + 32y2 and x2+64y2 (since 113 = 92 + 32×12 and 113 = 72 + 64×12).
The prime p = 41 is congruent to 9 modulo 16 and is representable by x2 + 32y2 (since 41 = 32 + 32×12), but not by x2 + 64y2.
The prime p = 73 is congruent to 9 modulo 16 and is representable by x2 + 64y2 (since 73 = 32 + 64×12), but not by x2 + 32y2.

Similar results
Five results similar to Kaplansky's theorem are known:

A prime p congruent to 1 modulo 20 is representable by both or none of x2 + 20y2 and x2 + 100y2, whereas a prime p congruent to 9 modulo 20 is representable by exactly one of these quadratic forms.
A prime p congruent to 1, 16 or 22 modulo 39 is representable by both or none of x2 + xy + 10y2 and x2 + xy + 127y2, whereas a prime p congruent to 4, 10 or 25 modulo 39 is representable by exactly one of these quadratic forms.
A prime p congruent to 1, 16, 26, 31 or 36 modulo 55 is representable by both or none of x2 + xy + 14y2 and x2 + xy + 69y2, whereas a prime p congruent to 4, 9, 14, 34 or 49 modulo 55 is representable by exactly one of these quadratic forms.
A prime p congruent to 1, 65 or 81 modulo 112 is representable by both or none of x2 + 14y2 and x2 + 448y2, whereas a prime p congruent to 9, 25 or 57 modulo 112 is representable by exactly one of these quadratic forms.
A prime p congruent to 1 or 169 modulo 240 is representable by both or none of x2 + 150y2 and x2 + 960y2, whereas a prime p congruent to 49 or 121 modulo 240 is representable by exactly one of these quadratic forms.

It is conjectured that there are no other similar results involving definite forms.

Notes

Theorems in number theory
Quadratic forms